The women's snowboard cross competition in snowboarding at the 2022 Winter Olympics was held on 9 February, at the Genting Snow Park in Zhangjiakou. Lindsey Jacobellis of the United States became the Olympic champion. Jacobellis dominated the snowboard cross for almost two decades, winning the X Games ten times and the world championships six times, but her only Olympic medal so far was the silver in 2006, when she started celebrating her win too early and was overtaken at the finish line. Chloé Trespeuch of France, the 2014 bronze medalist, won the silver medal, and  Meryeta O'Dine of Canada the bronze, her first Olympic medal.

In the victory ceremony, the medals were presented by Pál Schmitt, IOC Member, Hungary, Olympian, 2 Golds for Fencing 1968 and Fencing 1972, accompanied by Johan Eliasch, FIS President, Great Britain.

Summary
The defending champion was Michela Moioli. The 2018 silver medalist, Julia Pereira de Sousa Mabileau, qualified for the Olympics as well. The bronze medalist and the 2014 champion, Eva Samková, was injured and could not participate. At the 2021–22 FIS Snowboard World Cup, six snowboard cross events were held before the Olympics. Charlotte Bankes was leading the ranking, followed by Trespeuch and Moioli. Bankes was the 2021 world champion, with Moioli and Samková being the silver and bronze medalists, respectively.

Qualification

A total of 32 snowboarders qualified to compete at the games. For an athlete to compete they must have a minimum of 100.00 FIS points on the FIS Points List on January 17, 2022 and a top 30 finish in a World Cup event or at the FIS Snowboard World Championships 2021. A country could enter a maximum of four athletes into the event.

Results

Seeding run
The seeding run was held at 11:00.

Elimination round

1/8 finals

Heat 1

Heat 2

Heat 3

Heat 4

Heat 5

Heat 6

Heat 7

Heat 8

Quarterfinals

Heat 1

Heat 2

Heat 3

Heat 4

Semifinals

Heat 1

Heat 2

Finals
Small final

Big final

References

Women's snowboarding at the 2022 Winter Olympics